Bano Khalil Ahmed is a Pakistani politician who is the member of the Provincial Assembly of Balochistan.

Personal life
Bano was born on 10 November 1969 in Jacobabad, located in Sindh province of Pakistan. She is married to Hafiz Khalil Ahmed and lives in Quetta, Balochistan, Pakistan.

Political career
Bano was elected to the Provincial Assembly of Balochistan as a candidate of Muttahida Majlis-e-Amal (MMA). She was elected on a reserved seat for women, a consequence of the 2018 Pakistani general election. She assumed membership of the assembly on 13 August 2018.

References

Living people
Muttahida Majlis-e-Amal politicians
Politicians from Balochistan, Pakistan
1969 births